Barneveld Noord is a railway station located in Harselaar and the north of Barneveld, Netherlands. The distance to the railway station from the center of the city Barneveld Centrum is 2.8 kilometers. The station was opened on 15 May 1938 and is located on the Valleilijn. The station closed on 7 September 1944 and re-opened 20 May 1951. Valleilijn trains operated by Connexxion call at this station and were previously operated by Nederlandse Spoorwegen. The station has one platform and since 2006 a park and ride facility called Transferium Barneveld-Noord off the A1 motorway Junction 16.

Train service
, the following local train services call at this station:

Stoptrein: Amersfoort - Barneveld - Ede-Wageningen
Stoptrein: Amersfoort - Barneveld

Bus services
 105: Harderwijk - Ermelo - Putten - Voorthuizen - Barneveld - Kootwijkerbroek - Harskamp - Otterlo - Arnhem

Gallery

References

External links
Dutch Public Transport journey planner 

Noord
Railway stations opened in 1938
Railway stations closed in 1944
Railway stations opened in 1951
Railway stations on the Valleilijn
1938 establishments in the Netherlands
Railway stations in the Netherlands opened in the 20th century